Donald or Don Cook may refer to:
Donald Cook (Medal of Honor) (1934–1967), U.S. Marine and Vietnam War prisoner of war
USS Donald Cook (DDG-75), U.S. Navy destroyer named after the Medal of Honor recipient
Donald Cook (actor) (1901–1961), American Broadway and film actor
Donald C. Cook (1909–1981), American bureaucrat, chairman of American Electric Power
Donald C. Cook Nuclear Generating Station, power plant named after the bureaucrat and chairman of company
Donald G. Cook (born 1946), U.S. Air Force general
Don Cook (organist), organist and professor at Brigham Young University
Don Cook (born 1949), American record producer and songwriter
Don Cook (journalist) (1920–1995), American foreign correspondent

Cook, Donald